Sir Nicholas L'Estrange, 4th Baronet (1661–1724), of Hunstanton, Norfolk, was an English politician.

He was a Member (MP) of the Parliament of England for Castle Rising in 1685.

References

1661 births
1724 deaths
English MPs 1685–1687
People from Hunstanton